Live at Club Mozambique is a live album by American organist Lonnie Smith recorded in Detroit in 1970 and released on the Blue Note label in 1995.

Reception 

Allmusic's Richie Unterberger said: "It's odd that Blue Note decided to sit on it for so long, because it ranks as one of Lonnie's better sets. The band, featuring George Benson on guitar, is relaxed and funky without being in your face about it, and unlike much soul-jazz of the time, most of the material is original, Smith having penned six of the eight numbers. Although the riffs often owe a lot to James Brown, this is definitely at least as much jazz as soul".

Track listing
All compositions by Lonnie Smith except where noted
 "I Can't Stand It" – 8:24
 "Expressions" – 11:30
 "Scream" – 9:47
 "Play It Back" – 9:35
 "Love Bowl" – 9:43
 "Peace of Mind" – 7:38
 "I Want to Thank You" (Sly Stone) – 9:51	
 "Seven Steps to Heaven" (Victor Feldman, Miles Davis) – 7:06

Personnel
Lonnie Smith – organ, vocals
Dave Hubbard – tenor saxophone
Ronnie Cuber – baritone saxophone
George Benson – guitar
Joe Dukes – drums
Clifford Mack – tambourine

References

Blue Note Records live albums
Lonnie Smith (organist) live albums
1995 live albums
Albums produced by Francis Wolff